Gurkovo is a small town in the Stara Zagora Province, South-central Bulgaria. It is the administrative centre of the homonymous Gurkovo Municipality. As of December 2018, the town has a population of 2,723 inhabitants.

It is located along the main route that links the important Bulgarian city of Veliko Tarnovo with the Thrace region of Bulgaria, notably Burgas on the Black Sea.

The town is named after General Iosif Gurko, one of Russian commanders in Russo-Turkish War (1877–1878).

Population
As of December 2018, there are 2,723 inhabitants living in the town of Gurkovo. Bulgarians constitute 75% of the population, while Romani people make up the remainder (24%). There are also a few Turks. Main religion is Orthodox Christianity.

References

Populated places in Stara Zagora Province
Towns in Bulgaria